Ralph Joseph Gleason (March 1, 1917 – June 3, 1975) was an American music critic and columnist. He contributed for many years to the San Francisco Chronicle, was a founding editor of Rolling Stone magazine, and cofounder of the Monterey Jazz Festival. A pioneering rock critic, he helped the San Francisco Chronicle transition into the rock era.

Life and career
Ralph Joseph Gleason was born in New York City on March 1, 1917. He graduated from Columbia University (where he was news editor of the Columbia Daily Spectator) in 1938. In 1939, Gleason co-founded Jazz Information, with  Eugene Williams, Ralph de Toledano, and Jean Rayburn (maiden name; 1918–2009, who married Ralph Gleason in 1940).

During World War II, he worked for the Office of War Information. After WWII, Gleason moved to the San Francisco Bay Area and in 1950, began writing for the San Francisco Chronicle. Gleason wrote a syndicated column on jazz, hosted radio programs, and cofounded the Monterey Jazz Festival. He also wrote liner notes for Lenny Bruce's comedy albums and testified for the defense at Bruce's San Francisco 1962 obscenity trial.

He wrote liner notes for a broad variety of releases, including the 1959 Sinatra album No One Cares and the 1970 Davis album Bitches Brew. From 1948 to 1960, he doubled as an associate editor and critic for DownBeat. He also taught music appreciation courses at University of California Extension (1960-1963) and Sonoma State University (1965-1967).

Gleason was a widely respected commentator when he began to support several Bay Area rock bands, including Jefferson Airplane and the Grateful Dead, in the late 1960s. Although Gleason was sometimes criticized for minimizing the importance of or simply ignoring acts from Los Angeles, others judged that he was making a valid distinction between works of creative vitality and music business product. In any case, Gleason was a key contributor to the growth and range of the Bay Area's vibrant music scene of the 1960s and after.

Gleason was a contributing editor to Ramparts, a prominent leftist magazine based in San Francisco, but quit after editor Warren Hinckle criticized the city's growing hippie population. With Jann Wenner, another Ramparts staffer, Gleason founded the bi-weekly music magazine, Rolling Stone, to which he contributed as a consulting editor until his death in 1975. He was in the midst of an acrimonious split with Wenner and the magazine when he died. For ten years he also wrote a syndicated weekly column on jazz and pop music that ran in the New York Post and many other papers throughout the United States and Europe.

Gleason's articles also appeared other publications, including The New York Times, The Guardian, The Times, New Statesman, Evergreen Review, The American Scholar, Saturday Review, the New York Herald Tribune, the Los Angeles Times, the Chicago Sun-Times, the Sydney Morning Herald, Playboy, Esquire, Variety, The Milwaukee Journal1 and Hi-Fi/Stereo Review.

For National Educational Television (now known as PBS), Gleason produced a series of twenty-eight programs on jazz and blues, Jazz Casual, featuring Dizzy Gillespie, B.B. King, John Coltrane, Dave Brubeck, the Modern Jazz Quartet, Vince Guaraldi with Bola Sete, Jimmy Witherspoon, and Sonny Rollins, among others. The series ran from 1961 to 1968.  He also produced a two-hour documentary on Duke Ellington, which was twice nominated for an Emmy.

Other films for television included a four-part series on the Monterey Jazz Festival, the first documentary for television on pop music, Anatomy of a Hit, and the hour-long programs on San Francisco rock, Go Ride the Music, for the series Fanfare, episode 9, for National Educational Television, A Night at the Family Dog, episode 10, for National Educational Television, and West Pole.

Gleason's name shows up in tribute on Red Garland's "Ralph J. Gleason Blues" from the 1958 recording Rojo (Prestige PRLP 7193), re-released on Red's Blues in 1998.

Gleason's lasting legacy, however, is his work with Rolling Stone. His name, alongside that of Hunter S. Thompson, still remains on the magazine's masthead today, more than four decades after his death.

On June 3, 1975, Gleason died of a heart attack at the age of 58 in Berkeley, California.

Ralph J. Gleason Music Book Award
Originally awarded by BMI and Rolling Stone. Currently awarded by the Rock & Roll Hall of Fame, New York University’s Clive Davis Institute of Recorded Music, and The Pop Conference.
1990 — Standing in the Shadows of Motown: The Life and Music of Legendary Bassist James Jamerson by Allan Slutsky
1993 — Rhythm and the Blues by Jerry Wexler
1994 — Last Train to Memphis: The Rise of Elvis Presley by Peter Guralnick
1998 — Visions of Jazz: The First Century by Gary Giddins
2000 — Workin' Man Blues: Country Music in California by Gerald W. Haslam
2022 — Liner Notes for the Revolution: The Intellectual Life of Black Feminist Sound by Daphne A. Brooks

Bibliography
Jam Session (1957), G.P. Putnam's Sons 
Jam Session. An Anthology of Jazz (1958), Peter Davies Pub.
 The Jefferson Airplane and the San Francisco Sound (1969), Ballantine Books 
 Celebrating the Duke and Louie, Bessie, Billie, Bird, Carmen, Miles, Dizzy & Others (1975), Atlantic-Little, Brown. 
Conversations in Jazz: The Ralph J. Gleason Interviews (2016), Yale University Press. . Interviews with John Coltrane, Quincy Jones, Dizzy Gillespie, John Lewis, Milt Jackson, Percy Heath, Connie Kay, Sonny Rollins, "Philly" Joe Jones, Bill Evans, Horace Silver, Duke Ellington, Les McCann, Jon Hendricks.
 Music in the Air: The Selected Writings of Ralph J. Gleason (2016), Yale University Press.

Quotations

In a 1976 review  of the Santana album Caravanserai, Gleason wrote that the album affirmed, and "speaks directly to the universality of man, both in the sound of the music and in the vocals."

References

External links
 Ralph J. Gleason's Jazz Casual
 Ralph J. Gleason's Sinatra liner notes
 "Joan Baez, Dylan Drop World of Folk Music for Rock'n'Roll", The Milwaukee Journal, Green Sheet, p. 3.
 

1917 births
1975 deaths
American columnists
American magazine founders
American music critics
American music journalists
American publishers (people)
American magazine publishers (people)
Columbia College (New York) alumni
Jazz writers
San Francisco Chronicle people
Writers from New York (state)
Writers from the San Francisco Bay Area
20th-century American musicians
Rolling Stone people
20th-century American writers
People of the United States Office of War Information